DHL de Guatemala S.A. is a cargo airline based in Guatemala City, Guatemala. It is wholly owned by Deutsche Post and provides services for the group's DHL-branded logistics network in Guatemala.
Its main base is La Aurora International Airport.

Destinations
DHL de Guatemala operates freight services to the following international scheduled destinations (at January 2005):

Fleet

Current fleet

The DHL De Guatemala fleet consists of the following aircraft (as of January 2021):

Former fleet
1 Boeing 727-100F
2 Dassault Falcon 20
1 Fairchild Swearingen Metroliner

See also
List of airlines of Guatemala

References

External links

Airlines of Guatemala
Cargo airlines
Airlines established in 1989
DHL
Companies of Guatemala